Longkümer is an Ao Naga surname. Notable people with the surname include:

 Imtikümzük Longkümer (1967–2018), Indian politician
 Macnivil (Akaba Martin Longkümer), musician
 Sharingain Longkümer, Indian politician
 Temsüyanger Longkümer, artist

Surnames of Naga origin
Naga-language surnames